Kenneth Holmlund is an American politician. He is a Republican representing District 38 in the Montana House of Representatives.

Political career

Holmlund was first elected to represent District 38 in 2014, and is running for his third re-election in 2020.

Holmlund currently chairs the Natural Resources and Transportation committee, and is also a member of the Appropriations committee.

Holmlund is an opponent of Sanctuary cities. He has sponsored legislation to Ban Sanctuary cities in Montana twice. Once in 2019 and again in 2021. His 2021 bill passed on On April 1, 2021 when Governor Greg Gianforte signed the bill that bans Sanctuary cities in the state of Montana into law.

Electoral record

References

Living people
21st-century American politicians
Republican Party members of the Montana House of Representatives
People from Miles City, Montana
Year of birth missing (living people)